Pe Aung  (9 April 1917 – 5 July 2006) was a professor and author from Myanmar. Born in Malatto Village, Maubin to parents U Chan Tha and Daw Hla Zin, his most famous work is titled Book of Samatha.

Early life and education
When Pe Aung passed the matriculation Exam in Maubin, he continued to study at the University of Rangoon and earned M.A. degree. At the age of thirty, he got M.S. degree in Library Science from Columbia University.

Career
He served as a Director at the International Buddhist University, Chairman of Buddhist Research Association of Burma, Professor at Department of Philosophy, Rangoon University, Consultant in the Ministry of Education and Chairman of Research Association of Myanmar.

Literary work

In 1950, Pe Aung earned M.A. degree from the University of Rangoon by submitting Book of Samatha that is written in English. This book was translated into Burmese by U Aung Tin in 1952. "The nature of developing mind", published in 1977 was also the Burmese version of it translated by Nanda Thein Zan.

Hypnotism and Applied Psychology

In 1970s, while Pe Aung served as a director at Kaba Aye Buddhist University, he taught his pupils the various methods of Samatha as well as Hypnotism and Applied Psychology.

References

 U Pe Aung (2008). "Hypnotism and Psycho-Physiological Health", (in Burmese) Yan Aung Press, Yangon.

1917 births
2006 deaths